Jonas Gunnarsson may refer to:

 Jonas Gunnarsson (ice hockey player) (born 1992), Swedish ice hockey player
 Jonas Gunnarsson (politician) (1980), Swedish politician